Raja Alam International Airport , also known as Kalimarau Airport, is an airport serving Tanjung Redeb in the Berau Regency, East Kalimantan province, Indonesia. A new terminal building with a capacity of more than five hundred passengers and two aerobridge was inaugurated in October 2012.

Facilities

The airport has 10,462 square meter domestic terminal, 505 square meter VIP terminal, 5,700 square meter international terminal, and 592 square meter cargo terminal.

Airlines and destinations

References

External links
 

Berau Regency
Airports in North Kalimantan